West Cold Spring station is a Metro SubwayLink station in Baltimore, Maryland. It is located at the intersection of Wabash Avenue and Cold Spring Lane in the Arlington neighborhood, adjacent to the Towanda-Grantley neighborhood. It is the sixth most northern and western station on the line, with approximately 300 parking spaces.

The station features the sculpture "Wabash Outcrop" by Jim Sanborn. In 2021, funding was allocated for a community driven public art project, Towanda LaneScape, adjacent to West Cold Spring station.

Station layout

References

External links

Metro SubwayLink stations
Railway stations in the United States opened in 1983
1983 establishments in Maryland
Railway stations in Baltimore